Hieracium bakerianum is a species of hawkweed.

The species is named in honor of botanist John Gilbert Baker.

Range
It is native to Great Britain.

References

bakerianum